SSK may refer to:
 Sosyal Sigorta Kurumu, the former name of Sosyal Güvenlik Kurumu
 SSK (hull classification symbol), denoting a diesel-powered attack submarine
 SSK Industries, firearm manufacturer
 Mercedes-Benz SSK, a 1930s car
 Sentral di Sindikatonan di Korsou, the Trade Union Centre of Curaçao
 Sistema Simvolicheskogo Kodirovanija, an assembly language for Minsk family of computers
 Sociology of scientific knowledge
 Selånger SK, sports club in Sweden
 Selånger SK Bandy
 Selånger FK
 Sandslåns SK, sports club in Sweden
 Sunnanå SK, sports club in Sweden
 Södertälje SK, ice hockey club in Sweden
 Slovene Union, Italian political party